Punchbuggy (formed in 1994) in Ottawa, Ontario was a Canadian pop punk band. The band released four full-length albums.  Their song "Lucky Me, Lucky You" appeared in Tom Green movie Freddy Got Fingered.

History
Punchbuggy formed in Ottawa, Ontario, Canada in 1994 and is composed of Andrew Kieran (vocals, guitar), Jim Bryson (guitar, vocals), Darren Hore (vocals, bass), and Adam Luedickie (drums). Kieran, Hore, and Luedicke were childhood friends who met in the town of Elliot Lake. The trio played in the band Uncommon Society before forming Punchbuggy. Having toured Canada, the United States and Europe. In addition to several singles and compilations, they have three CD releases under their collective belts: All Nite Christian Rollerskate (Shake/Warner), Grand Opening Going Out of Business Sale (Shake/Warner), My Norwegian Cousin (Sour/Sony Music Canada) and The Great Divide (Boss Tuneage). 

In 1997, Bryson left the band to pursue a solo career and was replaced by Bryan Curry. 

The band describes their sound as "power pop punk", citing influences such as Doughboys, Goo Goo Dolls, Hüsker Dü, Pat Benatar, All, Kiss, and Cheap Trick.

In September 1999, they won the Born on the WWW contest sponsored by MusicDirect and IUMA and subsequently flown to California for the webcast of the awards ceremony, where the band played with Offspring and No Doubt. The track "Cletus" from the 1996 CD, Grand Opening Going Out of Business Sale is featured on a PlayStation title: Road Rash: Jailbreak and "Smash It Up" appears in the Roy Scheider film "Silverwolf".

Discography

Studio albums
1994: All Nite Christian Rollerskate
1996: Grand Opening Going Out of Business Sale
1998: My Norwegian Cousin
2002: The Great Divide

EPs
 Dressed for Success 7" MagWheel Records
 Punchbuggy/Treble Charger Split 7"” Rightwide

Compilations
 On Guard For Thee Compilation-AU GO GO Australia
 Ottawa City Speedway Compilation CARGO Records
 "Ripchordz As Fuck" Compilation ENGUARD Records
 "No Driver’s Side Airbag" Snowboard video
 "POP CAN ” Compilation Alert Records 
 "On the Road" Raw Energy/A+M Compilation

Members
Andrew Kieran (vocals, guitar, 1994–2001)
Darren Hore (bass, vocals, 1994–2001)
Adam Luedicke (drums, vocals, 1994–2001)
Ian Macdonald (keyboards, vocals)
Jim Bryson (guitar, 1994–97)
Bryan Curry (guitar, vocals, 1997)
Frank Viciana (guitar, vocals, 1997–2001)
Nick Belanger (bass, 1994)

References

Musical groups established in 1994
Musical groups disestablished in 2001
Musical groups from Ottawa
Canadian alternative rock groups
1994 establishments in Ontario
2001 disestablishments in Ontario
Restless Records artists